Oleg V. Minin (born March 22, 1960 in Novosibirsk Academytown, Russia), is a Russian physicist, corresponding member of the Russian Academy of Metrology and a full professor of Physics at the Tomsk Polytechnic University. He became known for contribution to the creation of new directions in science: THz 3D Zone plate, hypercumulative shaped charge, subwavelength structured light, including acoustics and surface plasmon.

Biography
He received his M.S. from Novosibirsk State University in 1982, and received his PhD degree of physics and mathematics on radiophysics, including quantum physics at Tomsk Institute of Atmospheric Optics in 1987. At the same time, from 1981 to 1982 he part-time worked as the laboratory assistants at the Institute of Applied Physics (Novosibirsk, Academytown), founded by his father in 1966-a famous scientist Prof. Vladilen F. Minin.

In March 2004 defended his doctoral thesis at the Novosibirsk State Technical University and received degrees of Doctor of Technical Sciences (Equivalent to Habilitation degree).

The dissertation (which were awarded in 2001 by the Ministry of Defence (Russia) for the best scientific work during 1997–2000) formed the basis of monographs "Diffractional Optics of Millimetre Waves", "Basic Principles of Fresnel Antenna Arrays" and later "Diffractive Optics and Nanophotonics: Resolution Below the Diffraction Limit” The biographical data of Prof. O.V.Minin were included in Marquis Who's Who in the World (2007). Almost all scientific work was carried out together with his brother (twins) prof. Igor V. Minin.

Due to the book, which were dedicated to the 40th anniversary of the Novosibirsk Institute of Applied Physics in April 2007, the FSB of Russia accused Oleg and his brother Igor of revealing state secrets sensitive information about projects at an institute that conducts research for the Ministry of Defence (Russia). This case was widely publicized, well-known scientists and human rights activists spoke out in defense of the physics brothers. In July of the same year, the FSB investigators dropped its charges against Oleg and Igor and prosecutors in Novosibirsk issued a rare apology to the scientists.

Research
O.V. Minin have established strong research foundations in different fields of physics, having a global priority, such as: shock wave focusing by diffractive optics, into explosive plasma antennas, subwavelength structured light and hypercumulative shaped charge.

He made the pioneering investigations of plasma jets produced by intense laser matter interactions based on hypercumulation principles to better understand astrophysical jets, where a cumulative jets are observed to originate from young stellar objects and active galactic nucleus. These results also give insight into shock wave.

O.V. Minin are the author or coauthor more than 150 patents in the USSR/Russia, and about 450 research publications including 22 monographs (12 in Russian, 9 in English and 1 in Chinese).

Awards
 For the contribution to the theory of hypercumulation, O.V. Minin was awarded the medal of the Russian National Committee on Theoretical and Applied Mechanics of Russian Academy of Sciences named after Kh.A. Rakhmatulin in 2013.

 Russian medals named after V.I. Vernadsky and A. Nobel.

Selected papers
 Minin O.V. and Minin I.V. Diffractional Optics of Millimetre Waves, lOP Publisher, 2004. 396 p. 
 Minin I.V. and Minin O.V. Basic Principles of Fresnel Antenna Arrays, Springer, 2008.  
 Minin I.V. and Minin O.V. Diffractive Optics and Nanophotonics: Resolution Below the Diffraction Limit, Springer, 2016.  
 Minin I.V. and Minin O.V. Control of focusing properties of diffraction elements, Sov. J. Quantum Electron, 20, 198 (1990).
 Minin I.V. and Minin O.V. 3D diffractive lenses to overcome the 3D Abbe subwavelength diffraction, Chinese Optics Letters, 12(6), 060014 (2014). 
 Pacheco-Peña V., Beruete M., Minin I.V. and Minin O.V. Terajets produced by dielectric cuboids, Appl. Phys. Let., 105, 084102 (2014).
 Luk’yanchuk B.S., Paniagua-Domínguez R., Minin I.V., Minin O.V. and Wang Z. Refractive index less than two: photonic nanojets yesterday, today and tomorrow (Invited). Optical Materials Express 7(6), 1820 (2017).
 Pham H.-H. N., Hisatake S., Minin O.V., Nagatsuma T. and Minin I.V. Enhancement of Spatial Resolution of Terahertz Imaging Systems Based on Terajet Generation by Dielectric Cube, APL Photonics 2, 056106 (2017).
 Minin I.V., Minin O.V., Katyba G.M., Chernomyrdin N.V., Kurlov V.N., Zaytsev K.I., Yue L., Wang Z. and Christodoulides D.N. Experimental observation of a photonic hook, Appl. Phys. Lett., 114, 031105 (2019).
 Rubio C., Tarrazó-Serrano D., Minin O.V., Uris A. and Minin I.V. Acoustical hooks: A new subwavelength self-bending beam, Results in Physics, 16, 102921 (2020).

References

1960 births
Living people
Russian physicists
Novosibirsk State University alumni
Tomsk Polytechnic University alumni